Manuel Lino Rodrigues Vilarinho (born 23 June 1948) is a Portuguese businessman who was the 32nd president of sports club S.L. Benfica.

Benfica

Born in Lisbon, Vilarinho was elected president of Benfica on 27 October 2000 with 62% of the votes, ousting the incumbent chairman João Vale e Azevedo in the second most contested election in the history of Benfica. In the club's football department, Vilarinho caused head coach José Mourinho to demand a contract extension and ultimately leave Benfica when he stated that he saw the team's former player and coach Toni as their manager for the future. Vilarinho later admitted that he would have probably renewed Mourinho's contract, but his refusal to negotiate an extension mid-season led to the manager's departure.

Vilarinho green-lighted the construction of the new Estádio da Luz, with the team moving to the stadium in 2004. Additionally, he gave his full support to the presidential candidacy of Luís Filipe Vieira, the club's director of football at the time, who became president of Benfica on 31 October 2003. Three years later, Vilarinho was elected as the fifth president of the club's General Assembly on 27 October.

Honours

Futsal (3 titles)
1 Portuguese League
1 Portuguese Cup
1 Portuguese SuperCup

Roller hockey (4 titles)
2 Portuguese Cup
2 Portuguese SuperCup

Rugby (1 title)
1 Campeonato Nacional Honra/Super Bock

Personal life
Vilarinho is married to Mariana Correia da Costa Pereira Caldas, daughter of João Jorge Dargent Pereira Caldas (of maternal French Belgian descent) and Ana Maria Bicker Correia da Costa (of remote Dutch descent).

References

External links
 S.L. Benfica profile

S.L. Benfica presidents
1948 births
Living people
People from Lisbon
Portuguese football chairmen and investors